Isaac Byrd II (born November 16, 1974) is a former professional American football wide receiver in the National Football League for the Tennessee Oilers/Titans and Carolina Panthers. He played college football at the University of Kansas.

Biography
Isaac grew up in St. Louis. In high school, he played competitive football, basketball and baseball. He won All-Conference, All-Metro and All-State honors in football and baseball. In basketball, he won All-Conference honors. He was also named the Missouri Player of the Year for football. After his senior year, the St. Louis Post Dispatch named Isaac the best athlete to come out of the state of Missouri.

He was heavily sought after by professional baseball teams and was the 24th round draft pick of the San Diego Padres.
However, Isaac decided to attend the University of Kansas on a full-ride scholarship to further his career in both football and baseball and to continue his education.

In college, Isaac dominated in both sports. In baseball, he played centerfield and was named Team MVP, 1st Team All-Big 12, 1st Team All-Big 12 Tournament and 2nd Team All-American. After his junior year, he was drafted by his hometown team, the St. Louis Cardinals.
After a stint in the minor leagues and batting over .300, Isaac returned to college to continue his education and his football career. Playing wide receiver, Isaac was named Team MVP and 2nd Team All-Big 12. He was then drafted in the 6th round of the 1997 NFL Draft by the Kansas City Chiefs. Following the 1997 preseason he was signed to the Chiefs practice squad. He was signed off the Chiefs practice squad by the Tennessee Oilers, later renamed the Titans.

Isaac enjoyed a 6-year career in the NFL playing for the Tennessee Titans and Carolina Panthers. His high point came when he started in Super Bowl XXXIV for the Tennessee Titans against his hometown team, the St. Louis Rams. He finished his career with the Carolina Panthers where he provided solid production. Isaac's older brother, Israel Byrd, played college football at Utah State and professionally for the New Orleans Saints.

After retiring from the NFL, Isaac has been focusing his time and expertise in developing both the physical and mental strengths of amateur athletes. He is a published author of the book; How To: Think Like a Pro, Act Like a Pro & Play Like a Pro. In his book he introduces the 8 Principles that Bridge the Gap Between Professional & Amateur Athletes.

Today Isaac travels the country as a speaker and radio host.

References

1974 births
Living people
Players of American football from St. Louis
American football wide receivers
Kansas Jayhawks football players
Tennessee Titans players
Carolina Panthers players
Parkway Central High School alumni